Grace Hartman (née Fulcher; July 14, 1918 – December 18, 1993) was a Canadian labour union activist, whose 1975 election to the presidency of the Canadian Union of Public Employees made her the first woman in North America to lead a major labour union.

Union activism 
Prior to 1963, Hartman was a member of one of CUPE's predecessor unions, the National Union of Public Employees. As a secretary for the Township of North York, Ontario, she was a member of NUPE Local 373. Hartman held several local executive positions and was elected president of the local in 1959, a position she held until 1967.

Feminist activism 
Hartman was a prominent participant in the feminist movement, and a strong advocate for gender pay equity. In 1965, she chaired the Ontario Federation of Labour's Women's Committee. She joined the steering committee of the Committee for the Equality of Women in Canada in 1966, which successfully lobbied the Canadian government to establish the Royal Commission on the Status of Women in Canada. In 1968, Hartman was appointed to the Advisory Council of the Royal Commission on the Status of Women. In 1974–75, she became the second national president of the National Action Committee on the Status of Women.

Honours and positions 
Hartman was awarded the Governor General's Award in Commemoration of the Persons Case in 1985.

Hartman was also awarded honorary Doctor of Laws degrees from York University and Queen's University.

References

Further reading 

 

 Montero, Gloria (1979). "Grace Hartman: Public Service Workers in the Sixties." We Stood Together: First-hand Accounts of Dramatic Events in Canada's Labour Past. Toronto: James Lorimer & Company. .

External links
 Profile of Grace Hartman on the CUPE website
 Essay on Grace Hartman  by Alex Beszterda, winner of the Norm Quan Bursary (2000), offered by CUPE Local 1975
 Grace Hartman, The Canadian Encyclopedia
 Grace Hartman, by Ann Farrell, section15.ca
 1976 CBC interview with Mary Lou Finlay

1918 births
1993 deaths
Canadian women trade unionists
Governor General's Award in Commemoration of the Persons Case winners
Women trade union leaders
Activists from Toronto
Canadian Union of Public Employees people